Southern Federal University's botanical garden is located in the North-Western part in Rostov-on-Don, in the Temernik river valley. It's the first botanical garden in the vast territory of the treeless zone in the South of Russia. There is a mineral spring called St.Seraphim of Sarov on the territory of the garden, which is presented by the Directorate of the garden as an Orthodox shrine.

History 

The need to create a Botanical garden in the city was first discussed in 1915, after the evacuation of the University of Warsaw to Rostov-on-don because of the danger of occupation of the Polish capital by German troops. But only in 1927, on the initiative of professors V. F. Chmielewski and V. N. Varshavskogo the city authorities have allocated for the Botanical garden 74,11 ha. Botanical garden the North Caucasus Federal University were the first on the vast territory of the treeless zone of the South of Russia. The Botanical garden of the North-Caucasian University was the first university on the enormous area of the treeless zone in the South of Russia. Its main task was acclimatization of the plants from other regions of the planet in the steppe region.

The Botanical garden appeared in 1927. In its place in the late 1920s in the floodplain were gardens and flower farm. The woody vegetation was almost absent. On the high right Bank of the Temernik river, limestone was mined for urban construction. The faceless landscape was occasionally disturbed by bushes in the beams, a willow tree by the river and a small group of trees near the flower farm. Part of the territory was occupied by arable land and hunting grounds.

The basis of the garden planning was the map of the North Caucasus. It was assumed that the main alleys and paths of the garden will correspond to the contours of the map of the region and its railway lines. In certain places of the track the plan was interrupted by the grounds and flower beds, symbolizing the city and the train station. Outside of this breakdown remained manor buildings, greenhouses and greenhouses, fruit and mother garden, vineyard, arboretum and a plot of ground floriculture. According to the authors of the project, when dividing the territory into separate curtain walls it was necessary to observe not only the scale, but also to reflect the relative relief of the region and its plant features. It was impossible to carry out the plan. Representatives of subalpine birch forests, foothills of oak forests and beech-fir planting, moved to new conditions, in the first years almost all died.

Thousand of Rostov's residents took part in the laying of the Botanical garden. All the work was done manually. Started in 1929, they were mostly completed in 1933. Already at that time, collections of decorative, technical and other cultures began to form. By 1940, the collection Fund of the garden numbered more than a thousand plants, including hornbeam, sycamore, velvet tree. The total area was 269.5 hectares, of which 100 hectares were occupied by the arboretum, 7 hectares of the greenhouse, 32 hectares of the nursery.

During the German occupation, not only greenhouses, office buildings and structures were destroyed, but the collections of greenhouse and flower-decorative herbaceous plants were completely lost. The Park and the arboretum were significantly damaged. Many large trees such as oak, hornbeam, beech, pine and others were destroyed. About 100 species of garden forms were killed, which made up one third of the collection, most of the most rare deciduous and evergreen plants. In the post-war period, all the buildings and the collection Fund of the Botanical garden were fully restored.

Nowadays the Botanical garden is a state budget educational and scientific unit of the southern Federal University. Under the power of attorney of the rector, he is vested with the powers of a legal entity with a separate budget balance and seal.

Collection 

The Botanical garden of the Southern Federal University is one of the largest University gardens in Russia. Its area exceeds 200 hectares. It is home to over 6,500 species of trees, shrubs and herbaceous plants. Almost 1600 species and forms reaches the flora collection collected in the greenhouse of tropical and subtropical cultures. Departments of nut, medicinal and other plants have been created.

Over 5,000 species of trees, shrubs and herbaceous plants grow in the greenhouses of the garden and in the open field, including the greenhouse of tropical and subtropical plants in the collection of flora of Africa, South-East Asia, North and South America, Australia collected almost 1600 species of plants. The garden includes the following collections:

 Dendrological collection;
 Collection of flower crops;
 Collection of medicinal and essential oil plants;
 Collection of tropical and subtropical plants;
 Exposition Azov steppe;
 Rare and endangered plant species in the collections of the Botanical garden;
 Herbarium of the Botanical garden;
 Delectus.

Especially remarkable are the ninety-year-old twenty-five-meter long black cherry oak, boxwood, barberry bushes, the thirty-year-old relic Ginkgo tree, juniper, sea buckthorn, and in the greenhouse collection there are agave, ficus, banana Paradise, date palm, bamboo.

References 

Tourist attractions in Rostov-on-Don
Buildings and structures in Rostov-on-Don
Cultural heritage monuments in Rostov-on-Don
Botanical gardens in Russia
Cultural heritage monuments of regional significance in Rostov Oblast